ATLAS.ti is a computer-assisted qualitative data analysis software that facilitates analysis of qualitative data for qualitative research, quantitative research, and mixed methods research.

Description and usage
ATLAS.ti is a tool that supports locating, coding/tagging, and annotating features within bodies of unstructured data; it also offers visualization functions. The software is used by researchers in a wide variety of fields, and it supports data in text, graphical, audio, video, and geospatial format. Through XML export, it also aims to provide a non-proprietary, cross-platform interface to facilitate academic collaboration.

Development history
A prototype of ATLAS.ti was developed by Thomas Muhr at Technical University in Berlin in the context of project ATLAS (1989–1992). A first commercial version of ATLAS.ti was released in 1993 to the market by company "Scientific Software Development," later ATLAS.ti Scientific Software Development GmbH. ATLAS.ti's founders have ascribed its methodological roots in part to grounded theory and content analysis. ATLAS.ti is currently available for Windows, Mac, Android, iOS, and via a web-based Cloud portal.

See also
Computer-assisted qualitative data analysis software

Literature

External links

Forum about Atlas

1993 software
QDA software